Peter Graham Waterfield (born 12 March 1981) is a British diver and Olympic silver medalist.

Diving career
Waterfield's specialism is the 10-metre platform event, both as solo competitor and in the synchronised event with his former partner Leon Taylor.  Despite their noticeable height difference (Peter is only , Leon is almost ) in a discipline normally requiring as much uniformity as possible, they turned in strong synchronised performances. Waterfield and Taylor came in fourth at the men's synchronised 10-metre platform in the 2000 Summer Olympics in Sydney. In the diving events at the 2004 Summer Olympics in Athens, they won the silver medal in the men's synchronised 10-metre platform – Britain's first Olympic diving medal since Brian Phelps in 1960.

In the 2002 Commonwealth Games held in Manchester, Waterfield's best solo showing to date came when he won the 10-metre gold medal.  In the 2006 Commonwealth Games he won a silver medal.

For the 2011 season, Waterfield was paired in the synchronised competitions with teenager Tom Daley; Daley had finished 7th in the individual competition at the 2008 Beijing Olympics and was also a British and European champion. During the 2012 London Olympics, Waterfield and Daley achieved an agonising 4th-placed finish in the 10 m synchro diving competition after dropping their 4th dive.

Personal life
Born in London, he lives in Southampton with his wife Tania and their two sons, Lewis (born 2001) and Marshall (born 2008). Waterfield is a member of the diving club and is coached by Lindsey Fraser.  In January 2013, it was announced that Waterfield, who had been losing hair since his early 20s, had undergone a hair transplantation operation in order to look "more appealing to TV companies and big brands seeking sponsors."

References

1981 births
Living people
English male divers
Divers at the 2000 Summer Olympics
Divers at the 2002 Commonwealth Games
Divers at the 2004 Summer Olympics
Divers at the 2006 Commonwealth Games
Divers at the 2008 Summer Olympics
Divers at the 2012 Summer Olympics
Olympic divers of Great Britain
Olympic silver medallists for Great Britain
Commonwealth Games gold medallists for England
Commonwealth Games silver medallists for England
Olympic medalists in diving
Sportspeople from Southampton
Medalists at the 2004 Summer Olympics
Commonwealth Games medallists in diving
Medallists at the 2002 Commonwealth Games
Medallists at the 2006 Commonwealth Games